Owzen Darreh-ye Pain (also Romanized as Owzen Darreh-ye Pā’īn) is a village in Tarrud Rural District, in the Central District of Damavand County, Tehran Province, Iran. At the 2006 census, its population was 17, with 4 families.

References 

Populated places in Damavand County